Ervin Township is one of eleven townships in Howard County, Indiana, United States. As of the 2010 census, its population was 2,227 and it contained 879 housing units.

History
Ervin township was named for Robert Ervin, a county judge.

In the mid-1800s, the township was home to two African American settlements, the Rush Settlement and the Bassett Settlement.  The Bassett settlement was the home of Richard Bassett, a Baptist minister who later became the third African-American state representative in Indiana history, and the first from Howard County.

Geography

The stream of Petes Run runs through this township.

Unincorporated towns
 Judson
 Kappa Corner
 Poplar Grove
 Ridgeway
(This list is based on USGS data and may include former settlements.)

Former Settlements
 Bassett
 Ervin
 Noble

Adjacent townships
 Deer Creek Township, Cass County (north)
 Jackson Township, Cass County (northeast)
 Clay Township (east)
 Monroe Township (south)
 Burlington Township, Carroll County (west)
 Carrollton Township, Carroll County (west)

Cemeteries
The township contains ten cemeteries: Barnett, Brown, Kappa, Mound, North Union, Petes Run, Pickett, Price, Rush and South Union.

Major highways

References
 
 United States Census Bureau cartographic boundary files

External links
 Indiana Township Association
 United Township Association of Indiana

Townships in Howard County, Indiana
Townships in Indiana